Hugues Claude Pissarro (born 1935) is a French painter. He is alternately known as Hugues Claude Pissarro, H. Claude Pissarro, and professionally as Isaac Pomié or Hugues Pissarro dit Pomié.  His work has been featured in exhibitions in Europe and the United States, and he was commissioned by the White House in 1959 to paint a portrait of U.S. President Dwight Eisenhower.

Pissarro's work has evolved through a variety of different styles and techniques, from abstract to avant-garde.  In 1989, he began a series of contemporary landscapes which were signed "Isaac Pomié" in order to distinguish them from his traditional works.  Today, the contemporary paintings are signed "Hugues Pissarro dit Pomié".

Life and career
He is the grandson of Camille Pissarro and son of Paul-Émile Pissarro.  He was born in Neuilly-sur-Seine, where he frequently returned with his father on painting excursions.  He first exhibited his work at the age of fourteen, and subsequently studied in Paris.

He later became a professor of art and taught for many years in places such as Monaco. He also taught his daughter, Lélia Pissarro, to paint.

Training 
 École du Louvre
 École Normale Supérieure

References

H. Claude Pissarro – Stern Pissarro Gallery
Biography - Grace Art Gallery
Exhibit offers portrait of a dynasty By James Auer, Milwaukee Journal Sentinel art critic April 09, 1999
Humanities Web, Contributed by Jim Lane 15 April 2001
Artnews.com

Claude
20th-century French painters
20th-century French male artists
French male painters
21st-century French painters
French people of Portuguese-Jewish descent
21st-century French male artists
20th-century French Sephardi Jews
Jewish painters
1935 births
Living people
People from Neuilly-sur-Seine